Swingin' for Schuur is a 2001 album by American jazz musicians Diane Schuur and Maynard Ferguson, accompanied by his Big Bop Nouveau big band.

Swingin’ For Schuur was on the charts for 9 weeks and peaked at 23 before falling to 50 on the last week.

Track listing
 "Just One of Those Things" (Cole Porter) – 4:09
 "Bésame Mucho" (Sunny Skylar, Consuelo Velázquez) – 5:20
 "Deep Purple" (Peter De Rose, Mitchell Parish) – 6:28
 "Autumn Leaves" (Joseph Kosma, Johnny Mercer, Jacques Prévert) – 3:33
 "My Romance" (Lorenz Hart, Richard Rodgers) – 3:52
 "Love Letters" (Edward Heyman, Victor Young) – 4:39
 "East of the Sun (and West of the Moon)" (Brooks Bowman) – 3:35
 "Midnight Sun" (Sonny Burke, Lionel Hampton, Johnny Mercer) – 5:58
 "I Fall in Love Too Easily" (Sammy Cahn, Jule Styne) – 4:31
 "Lush Life" (Billy Strayhorn) – 5:58
 "Just Friends" (John Klenner, Sam M. Lewis) – 4:59
 "Let's Fall in Love" (Harold Arlen, Ted Koehler) – 3:45

Personnel

Performance
 Diane Schuur - vocals, piano
 Maynard Ferguson - trumpet
 Paul Armstrong - arranger, trumpet
 Denis DiBlasio - arranger, baritone saxophone
 Pete Ferguson - trumpet
 Patrick Hession - trumpet
 Jeff Lashway - piano
 Jeff Rupert - tenor saxophone
 Mike Dubaniewicz - alto saxophone
 Brian Stahurski - double bass
 Brian Wolfe - drums
 Tom Garling - arranger
 Chip McNeill
 Reggie Watkins trombone, arranger, musical director

Production
 Glen Barros - executive producer
 John Burk
 Phil Ramone - producer
 William Skip Rose
 Bob Barry - photography
 Dominic Camardella - engineer
 Don Hahn
 Charles Paakkari
 Mark Wilder
 Joseph d'Ambrosio - production coordination

References

2001 albums
Diane Schuur albums
Maynard Ferguson albums
Albums produced by Phil Ramone
Concord Records albums